George Currie may refer to:

 George Currie (Northern Irish politician) (1905–1978), Northern Irish barrister and politician
 George Currie (musician) (born 1950), Scottish musician and amateur archaeologist
 George Currie (academic) (1896–1984), Scottish-born agricultural scientist and Vice Chancellor of Universities in Australia and New Zealand
 George R. Currie (1900–1983), American jurist from Wisconsin
 George Currie (British politician) (1870–1950), British politician

See also
 George Curry (disambiguation)